HIPZEE is a Tony Award-nominated entertainment production company co-founded by husband-and-wife team Rob Baunoch III and Tara Sickmeier. The company was formed in Brooklyn, NY in 2013 and is currently based in Los Angeles, CA. HIPZEE produces theatre and on-screen content that targets adult audiences.

Background 
After a period of working in the theatre and film industry, Rob Baunoch III and Tara Sickmeier transitioned to executive roles, establishing their own production company, HIPZEE, in 2013.

During the company's initial few years, in addition to production, HIPZEE provided services such as marketing research, consulting, and financing. More recently, it is shifting to a focus on production.

HIPZEE's projects have included the Off-Broadway show HEATHERS: The Musical which was nominated for 'Best New Musical' by the Off-Broadway Alliance in 2014;  the 2017 Tony-Award-winning musical Natasha, Pierre, & The Great Comet of 1812;  and the company's first feature film Above the Shadows, which stars Olivia Thirlby, Alan Ritchson, Jim Gaffigan, and Megan Fox.

Production History

Stage 
Following its success in producing the Off-Broadway show, HEATHERS: The Musical, HIPZEE received a Tony Award nomination for its work on the Broadway musical Natasha, Pierre, and The Great Comet of 1812.

Screen 
HIPZEE's first feature film (Above the Shadows) was released in select theaters and VOD on July 19, 2019. Above the Shadows’ World Premiere was on May 31, 2019 as the opening night film of the 22nd Brooklyn Film Festival. It won the Audience Choice Award for Best Narrative Feature at BFF. HIPZEE most recently represented the film Feral as its sales company.

References

External links
 Official Website
 HIPZEE on Playbill

Film production companies of the United States